Ankit Sharma (born 30 July 1991 in New Delhi) is an Indian professional footballer who plays as midfielder. He previously played for Deportivo San Cristóbal de los Angeles in the Divisiones Regionales de Fútbol in the Community of Madrid, HAL and youth national Teams.

Ankit's professional career began with HAL, making his first team debut in 2010 aged 19.

Club career

HAL

Sharma got injured in Dr B.C Roy Trophy quarter Final match and had a six-month outing, but he recovered well and came back recovering from knee injury.
He joined Hindustan Aeronautics Limited S.C. midway through the 2010–11 season and made twelve appearances for the club.

He had one of the rarest and saddest experience while playing his trade at his first club.  HAL goalkeeper Arun Kumar collided with Ankit in training session just before the match against Pune FC, resulting in fracturing his right shin bone and injury to Ankit's right knee, which kept him out of training for a week's rest.

San Cristobal
After a season with HAL in 2011, Sharma moved to Spain after signing with Deportivo San Cristóbal de los Angeles in the Divisiones Regionales de Fútbol in the Community of Madrid.

Bhawanipore
In 2012, he signed a contract with Calcutta Football League outfit Bhawanipore FC.

Honours

Country
India U19
Dr. B.C. Roy Trophy: 2008–09

Club
HAL
I-League 2nd Division: 2010
Bhawanipore
Bordoloi Trophy: 2013

See also
List of Indian football players in foreign leagues

References

External links
Live your dream till the last breath : Ankit Sharma at indianfootballnetwork.com

1991 births
Living people
Indian footballers
I-League players
Footballers from Delhi
Association football midfielders
Hindustan Aeronautics Limited S.C. players
Indian expatriate footballers